Endelave is a Danish island in the Kattegat, north of Odense, off the coast of Funen, and west of Samsø.

Nature and Protected areas 
Endelave and its surrounding seaside is important for many birds, both on domestic and international levels and it is therefore a Ramsar area. The Ramsar protection is part of the Ramsar protection in Horsens Fjord and has number 152. The total area of the entire protection encompass 42,737 ha. The reef 'Møllegrunden' Northwest of the island is an important resting and breeding site for many seals in the Kattegat sea. The bay of Endelave is comprised by a large intertidal zone similar to the wadden sea area. About ⅓ of the island itself is protected under the Natura 2000 plan, housing vulnerable and outstanding nature-types such as a heather moorland thicket, a beach-meadow and oak forests for example.

Endelave is home to a population of wild rabbits of variable size. It is a locally distributed animal in Denmark, but where it is found the population is usually large. The rabbits on Endelave are hunted when in season and in the last few years, more than half of the total rabbit bag in Denmark (a stable level of 5000 animal pro anno), was from Endelave.

Gallery

See also 
 Nearby islands: Hjarnø, Tunø, Samsø, Æbelø, Alrø.
 Nearby cities: Horsens, Aarhus.

References

Sources 

 Endelave Danish Ministry of the Environment 
 Tageo.com, "VESTSJAELLAND DENMARK Geography Population" (coordinates), 2007, webpage: Tageo-index.
 Denmark Postal codes, webpage: Postnumre-DK.
 Tele.dk Denmark detailed road map, webpage: Tele-DK-Danmark.

Geography of Horsens Municipality
Islands of Denmark
Protected areas of Denmark
Ramsar sites in Denmark
Marine reserves
Natura 2000 in Denmark
Danish islands in Kattegat